Mikhail Gromov may refer to:
Mikhael Gromov (mathematician), Franco-Russian mathematician
Mikhail Gromov (aviator), Soviet aviator